The 1961 Texas A&M Aggies football team represented Texas A&M University in the 1961 NCAA University Division football season as a member of the Southwest Conference (SWC). The Aggies were led by head coach Jim Myers in his fourth season and finished with a record of four wins, five losses and one tie (4–5–1 overall, 3–4 in the SWC).

Schedule

References

Texas AandM
Texas A&M Aggies football seasons
Texas AandM Aggies football